Marta Kuzma (born June 21, 1964) is a curator, art theorist, and educator. In 2016, she became Dean of the Yale School of Art and is the first woman to serve in that role since the school was founded in 1869.

She was previously the vice chancellor and rector of the Stockholm Royal Institute of Art since 2014. Prior to her tenure at the Royal Institute of Art, Kuzma also served eight years as director of the Office for Contemporary Art Norway. In this role, she curated OCA's contribution to the Venice Biennial with the projects "The Collectors: Elmgreen & Dragset" (2009), "The State of Things" (2011), and "Beware of the Holy Whore: Munch and the Dilemma of Emancipation" (2013). She was also the founding director of the Soros Center for Contemporary Art in Kiev, Ukraine, the artistic director of the Washington Project for the Arts, in Washington, D.C., and was head of international exhibitions program at International Center of Photography in New York.  In 2004, she co-curated Manifesta 5 with Massimiliano Gioni in San Sebastian, Spain and in 2012 and she was a curator for Documenta (13).  She holds a B.A. in Art History and Political Economics from Barnard College and an M.A. in Aesthetics and Art Theory from the Centre for Research in Modern European Philosophy at Middlesex University, London.

References 

1964 births
Living people
Yale University faculty
American art historians
Women art historians
American art curators
American women curators
Barnard College alumni
American women academics
21st-century American women